Willard Earl Swihart (August 25, 1914 – August 9, 1999) was an American professional basketball player. He played in the National Basketball League for the Cleveland Chase Brassmen during the 1943–44 season. Swihart averaged 2.6 points per game.

References

1914 births
1999 deaths
American men's basketball players
Basketball players from Ohio
Centers (basketball)
Cleveland Chase Brassmen players
Forwards (basketball)
Sportspeople from Massillon, Ohio
Toledo Rockets men's basketball players